Castrén Cabinet may refer to:

 Kaarlo Castrén Cabinet, 4th Government of Finland 
 Urho Castrén Cabinet, 28th Government of Finland